This is a list of important buildings in Lima, the capital of the Peru.

The Historic Centre of Lima is a UNESCO World Heritage Site since 1991.

List

Pre-Columbian sites

Important Colonial buildings

References

 
Lima

Architecture in Peru
Lima
Lima